The 7th IBU Junior Open European Championships were held from 19 to 23 January 2022 in Pokljuka, Slovenia.

Schedule
All times are local (UTC+1).

Medal summary

Medal table

Men

Women

Mixed

References

External links
Official website 

IBU Junior Open European Championships
Junior Open European Championships
IBU Junior Open European Championships
IBU Junior Open European Championships
Biathlon competitions in Slovenia
International sports competitions hosted by Slovenia
IBU Junior Open European Championships